Alex Kurtagić (born 1970) is a British artist, musician, novelist, and publisher. He is the founder of Supernal Music and various publishing houses. For a time, he was a far-right speaker and writer, but has since disengaged from political extremism. His writing has dealt with topics relating to culture, society, politics, and music.

Life
Kurtagić was born in 1970. Due to his parents' jobs, he spent part of his youth in South America. In 1995, he founded the Black Metal music project Benighted Leams, which has since released four albums between 1996 and 2006. In 1996, he founded Supernal Music.

During the mid-to-late 1990s, his illustrations appeared on albums by black metal artists, such as Dimmu Borgir, Deinonychus, and Tormentor, among others. His cover of Dimmu Borgir's Stormblåst is featured in the book Heavy Metal Thunder: Album Covers That Rocked the World.

Writer
Kurtagić's dystopian novel, Mister, was published in 2009. From then until 2013, he was active as a far-right intellectual figure. In 2011, a collection of articles and essays was published in book form by Unitall Verlag in German translation, with the title Ja, Afrika muss zur Hölle gehen. A second collection, also in German, was published by Antaios in 2013 as Warum Konservative immer verlieren. 

In 2019, a book collecting his artwork was published, containing also anecdotal, fictional, semi-fictional, and satirical texts. In the preface, he distanced himself from political extremism.

A second novel, Angel, was published in 2022.

Supernal Music
Supernal Music offered a mail order catalogue of underground music throughout the late 1990s, particularly extreme metal and black metal. Its later roster included bands such as Astrofaes and Drudkh from Ukraine, Fleurety and Mayhem from Norway, and The Meads of Asphodel from the United Kingdom.

Discography

Benighted Leams
Caliginous Romantic Myth (1996)
Astral Tenebrion (1998)
Ferly Centesms (2004)
Obombrid Welkins (2006)

Bibliography
Mister. Iron Sky Publishing, 2009; 
Ja, Afrika muss zur Hölle gehen. Unitall Verlag, 2011; 
Warum Konservative immer verlieren, Antaios (2013); 
 The Art of Alex Kurtagic. Spradabach Publishing, 2019. 
Angel. Spradabach Publishing, 2022.

Translations
The Golden Tread by Miguel Serrano. The Palingenesis Project, 2017.
The Veil Lifted for the Curious, or the Secrets of the French Revolution Revealed with the Aid of Freemasonry by Jacques-François Lefranc. Spradabach Publishing, 2022.

References

External links
 
 2005 Interview with Benighted Leams

1970 births
British bloggers
British heavy metal musicians
Living people
Black metal musicians